SMA Negeri (SMAN) 2 Medan is a public high school in North Sumatra, Indonesia. The school covers Grades 10-12). It is located in the Medan City Region. The school achieved the title of a Specimen School for computer-based learning in 2009–2010.

Curriculum 

In 2013, the curriculum was updated to employ a more streamlined, modern style.

Lecturer 
Teachers in this school are required to have achieved a minimum post-secondary education level of a Bachelor of Arts or Bachelor of Science.

Leaders of Student Committee 
 Dwiki Ikhwan (2012–2013)
 Ardi Nur Abdul Hakim (2013–2014)
 Arbi M Harahap (2014–2015)

Achievements 
 1st champion First Aid Competition at TBM FK USU PeMa FK USU 2015
 2nd Champion First Aid Competition at TBM FK USU PeMa FK USU 2015
 2nd Champion Quiz Contest at TBM FK USU PeMa FK USU 2015
 1st Champion North Sumatera Debate Competition 2014
 Grand Champion at KEMSA PMR 032 SMA Negeri 15 Medan 2014
 Silver Medal 3rd Bali International Choir Festival, Denpasar- Bali 2014
 5th Champion Choir Competition at ITB 2010
 3rd Champion Medan Paskibra Formation 2008
 3rd Medan Quiz Contest Tahun 2009
 The Winner of Toyota Eco-Youth National Competition 2008–2011
 DBL Basketball

Facilities 
 Class room
 WI-FI
 Library
 Biology Laboratory
 Physics Laboratory
 Chemistry Laboratory
 Computer Laboratory
 Languages Laboratory
 Infirmary
 Canteen
 Photocopy
 Basketball Field
 Volleyball Field
 Soccer Field

Extracurricular 
 Palang Merah Remaja (PMR 001)
 Scout Movement
 PASKIBRA (PASSMANDU)
 BKM Al-Farabi
 Choir (Choir of Nazareth)
 XII IPA 1's Robot Team 2013
 Karate
 SMANDU-grafi
 Fame Dance
 Traditional Dance
 Basketball
 Tarung Drajat
 Karya ilmiah Remaja (KIR)

See also 
 List of schools in Indonesia

Schools in Indonesia
Education in North Sumatra